Dorrtown is an unincorporated community in Webster County, West Virginia, United States.

References 

Unincorporated communities in West Virginia
Unincorporated communities in Webster County, West Virginia